Roque V. Desquitado (August 3, 1897) was a Filipino Visayan lawyer, judge, and legislator from Cebu, Philippines. He served as Member of the House of Representatives for 7th congressional district of Cebu from 1939 to 1941.

Early life and education 
Roque Desquitado was born in Bantayan, Cebu on August 13, 1897. He took up law at the University of the Philippines and became a lawyer on November 5, 1923. He was the third Cebuano to achieve the highest marks in the bar exams (after Paulino Gullas and Cesar Kintanar), and the first from outside of Cebu City.

Career 
He practiced law as a profession and was the counsel of Development Bank of the Philippines on its complaint involving a loan transaction against Dionisio Mirang. For a short length of time, he was the law partner of Vicente Sotto.

On June 2, 1925, he ran under Partido Democrata as representative of Cebu's old 7th legislative district but lost to Paulino Ybañez. In 1928, he campaigned for the same congressional seat but withdrew his candidacy before the election. Switching political party to Nacionalista Party, he won the elections and served as representative of the same district for the 2nd National Assembly from January 24, 1939 to December 16, 1941.

He worked as Judge of the Court of First Instance in the province of Bohol, which was the Eight Judicial District. On September 24, 1943, the Department of Justice granted him the authority to hold court in Cebu City and in the province of Cebu.

References 

University of the Philippines alumni
Members of the National Assembly of the Philippines
20th-century Filipino lawyers
1897 births
Members of the House of Representatives of the Philippines from Cebu
Filipino judges
Year of death missing